Pwales is a settlement in St. Paul's Bay, Malta. The area was named for its marsh land, being a valley, and comes from the Latin word palus that means wetland. It is home to Is-Simar Nature Reserve, a number of farmhouses, and a church.
The wetland zone was eventually named P.Wales during the British rule after the Prince of Wales. Oblivious of what P.Wales stood for, the Maltese pronounced the name as Pwales and has been known so, since.

References

Populated places in Malta
St. Paul's Bay